Viola Fischerová (October 18, 1935 Brno – November 4, 2010 Prague) was a Czech poet, and translator.

Life
Her father was Josef Ludvík Fischer; her half sister is Sylva Fischerová.

She studied Slavic studies at universities in Brno and Prague.
She was a friend of Václav Havel.

In the 1960s, she worked as the literary editor of Czechoslovak Radio. In 1968, she went into exile with her future husband Karel Michal to Switzerland, where she studied German and history at the University of Basel and worked as a teacher. After the death of her husband in 1984, she went to Germany and worked with Radio Free Europe.
She remarried, to Josef Jedlička, and lived in Prague.

Her first collection of poetry could not come out in 1957, thus her official poetic debut was in 1993, with the collection of poems Requiem for Pavel Buksa.

Awards
She won the 2006 Dresden Lyric Prize for her book Nyní in German translation; the 2006 Czech Children's Book of the Year for Co vyprávěla dlouhá chvíle; and the 2010 Czech Poetry Book of the Year, for Domek na vinici.

Works
Zádušní básně za Pavla Buksu (Requiem for Pavel Buksa), Petrov, 1993
Babí hodina (Old Women’s Hour), Nakladatelství Franze Kafky, 1995
Jak pápěří (Like a Feather), Artforum - Jazzová sekce, 1995,  
Odrostlá blízkost (Grown Proximity), Petrov, 1996,  
Divoká dráha domovů (Wild Track of Homes), Torst, 1998, 
Matečná samota (Mother Solitude), Petrov, 2002,  
Nyní: Praha-Elba-Praha 2002-2003 (Now), Petrov, 2004,  
Co vyprávěla dlouhá chvíle (What the Boredom Told), Meander, 2005,  
Předkonec (Preliminary Ending), Agite/Fra, 2007,  
Písečné dítě (Sand Child), Agite/Fra, 2007,  
Domek na vinici (A Little House at the Vineyard), Agite/Fra, 2009,

References

1935 births
2010 deaths
Czech poets
Czech women writers
Writers from Brno
University of Basel alumni
Czech expatriates in Switzerland
20th-century poets
20th-century women writers